Galium parisiense is a species of flowering plant in the family Rubiaceae known by the common name wall bedstraw. A native of the Mediterranean area and Western Europe, it has become naturalised in North America and other parts of Europe.

Description
The stem is ringed with whorls of usually six (range four to seven) narrow linear or linear-lanceolate leaves, each a few millimetres long, and often reflexed downwards toward the stem. Each stem is topped with an open inflorescence of many clusters of tiny greenish-white or purplish-tinged flowers. The fruit is a nutlet densely coated in slender hooked bristles. It flowers between June and August.

Distribution and habitat
Wall bedstraw is native to the Mediterranean Basin of southern Europe and northern Africa, plus Turkey, Iran, and the islands of the eastern North Atlantic (Great Britain, Madeira, the Azores, the Canary Islands, Cape Verde). The species is also naturalized in some parts of North America, mostly on the Pacific coast of the United States and Canada but also at scattered locales in the southeastern US from Texas to Maryland. In its native range, Galium parisiense is typically found on hillsides and stream-banks. When introduced, it may appear in urban environments such as among cobble stones in Ghent and in railway marshalling yards in Antwerp.

It often grows in rocky habitats. In areas with significant human disturbance, it is a "wall specialist", easily taking hold in historic stone walls.

References

External links

Jepson Manual Treatment
USDA Plants Profile

parisiense
Flora of Great Britain
Flora of Iran
Flora of the United States
Flora of British Columbia
Flora of the Azores
Flora of the Canary Islands
Flora of Cape Verde
Flora of Europe
Plants described in 1753
Taxa named by Carl Linnaeus
Flora without expected TNC conservation status